Shushi Province is a province of the breakaway Republic of Artsakh, de jure part of the Republic of Azerbaijan. The province has 7 communities of which 1 is considered urban and 6 are rural. The town of Shushi (Shushi) and Karin Tak came under control of the Azerbaijan Army after the 2020 Battle of Shushi.

Sites of interest 
 Shushi, its largest community
 The "rock" of Shushi, below which is the village of Karin Tak (Քարին Տակ; Under the Rock). The "rock" is prominent in Armenian history as it was from there that Armenian fighters ambushed the Azeri military who were held in Shushi during the First Nagorno-Karabakh War
 Ghazanchetsots Cathedral, 1868–1887
 The Shushi Tank Memorial
 The church of Kanach Zham (Կանաչ Ժամ եկեղեցի), 1847

References

External links 
 History of Shushi

Regions of the Republic of Artsakh
Shushi (province)